The Prince-Bishopric of Lübeck, was an ecclesiastical principality of the Holy Roman Empire until 1803. Originally ruled by Roman-Catholic bishops, after 1586 it was ruled by lay administrators and bishops who were members of the Protestant Holstein-Gottorp line of the House of Oldenburg. The prince-bishops had seat and vote on the Ecclesiastical Bench of the College of Ruling Princes of the Imperial Diet.

The Prince-Bishopric of Lübeck, a secular state, should not be confused with the Diocese of Lübeck, which was larger and over which the bishop exercised only pastoral authority.

History

The original diocese was founded about 970 by Emperor Otto I in the Billung March at Oldenburg in Holstein (Aldinborg or Starigard), the former capital of the pagan Wagri tribe. Oldenburg was then a suffragan diocese of the Archbishopric of Bremen, meant to missionize the Obotrites. However, in the course of the 983 Slavic uprising (see Lutici), the Wagri shook off Imperial supremacy and in 1038, the bishops were barred from entering their diocese. In 1052, the dioceses of Ratzeburg and Schwerin were split off from Oldenburg and no bishop was appointed after 1066.

After the Saxon count Henry of Badewide had campaigned in the Wagrian lands east of the Limes Saxoniae in 1138/39, a new Bishop of Oldenburg, Vicelinus, was appointed in 1149. Duke Henry the Lion of Saxony moved the seat of the diocese from Oldenburg to Lübeck in 1160. When the Duchy of Saxony was dissolved with Henry's deposition in 1180, the Bishopric gained the status of Imperial State. Quarrels arose after the City of Lübeck gained imperial immediacy in 1226 and as the territory of the state was centered on Eutin, the town in 1309 became the residence of the bishops.

 The Bishopric did not attempt to fight the Protestant Reformation. In 1531 the Free City of Lübeck, instanced by Johannes Bugenhagen, had turned Protestant, further inhibiting Catholic pastoring in the part of the Lübeck diocese under city rule. And in 1535 the Lübeck cathedral chapter and subsequently all its diocesan territories adopted the Lutheran confession. The Prince-Bishop was elected by the chapter; since 1586, all administrators of the prince-bishopric were members of the Holstein-Gottorp line of the House of Oldenburg. After the 1648 Peace of Westphalia, Lübeck was one of only two Protestant prince-bishoprics in the Empire (together with Osnabrück, which however was alternately led by Protestant and Catholic bishops).

Principality and Region of Lübeck
It became the Principality of Lübeck and was given to the Duchy of Oldenburg, since the last prince-bishop (Peter I of Holstein-Gottorp) was also prince regent of Oldenburg. In 1803 the principality comprised 9.5 German square miles with 22,000 inhabitants. Its capital was Eutin.

The Duchy of Oldenburg, named after its capital Oldenburg in Oldenburg, thus shared its name with the town of Oldenburg in Holstein, the original seat of the Bishopric, only by coincidence.

 Following the Austro-Prussian War in 1867 the principality was enlarged by the prior Holsteinian bailiwick of Ahrensbök, as a compensation for hereditary claims of the ducal House of Oldenburg to Holstein. After Oldenburg became a republic in 1918 the area remained an exclave of the Free State of Oldenburg now named Region of Lübeck.

 In 1937 the region was incorporated into the Prussian Province of Schleswig-Holstein by a territorial redeployment according to the Greater Hamburg Act. The Region of Lübeck then became the District of Eutin, which was merged with the neighbouring District of Oldenburg in Holstein in the new district of Eastern Holstein in 1970.

The Lutheran Church, since the Protestant Reformation comprising the majority of the inhabitants, remained a separate entity, named Evangelical Lutheran State Church of the Oldenburgian Region of Lübeck (chaired by a land provost or bishop in Eutin) until it merged with neighbouring Landeskirchen in the new North Elbian Evangelical Lutheran Church in 1977.

Geography

Bishops of Oldenburg and Lübeck

Notes

References

At Meyers Konversationslexikon, 4th ed., 1885-92

States and territories established in 1160
Prince-bishoprics of the Holy Roman Empire in Germany
Lower Saxon Circle
Roman Catholic dioceses in the Holy Roman Empire
Former Roman Catholic dioceses in Germany
History of Lübeck
Dioceses established in the 10th century
1180s establishments in the Holy Roman Empire
1180 establishments in Europe
1803 disestablishments in the Holy Roman Empire
Former states and territories of Schleswig-Holstein